

This is a list of the National Register of Historic Places listings in Labette County, Kansas.

This is intended to be a complete list of the properties and districts on the National Register of Historic Places in Labette County, Kansas, United States. The locations of National Register properties and districts for which the latitude and longitude coordinates are included below, may be seen in a map.

There are 13 properties and districts listed on the National Register in the county.  One property was once listed but has since been removed.

Current listings

|}

Former listings

|}

See also
 List of National Historic Landmarks in Kansas
 National Register of Historic Places listings in Kansas

References

Labette
Buildings and structures in Labette County, Kansas